A machmoum is a small flower bouquet or necklace made of jasmine or full (Arabian Jasmine), specific to Tunisia. It is sold during the summer in the afternoon or in the evening.

The men wear it on their ear, the women in their cleavage or carry it by hand.

References

Jasminum
Tunisian culture